Eric Dario Crisologo Singson is a Filipino businessperson and politician from the province of Ilocos Sur. He served Ilocos Sur's 2nd District from June 30, 1987 until June 30, 1998, and again from June 30, 2001 until June 30, 2010, and lastly from June 30, 2013 until June 30, 2019.

References 

Year of birth missing (living people)
Living people
Members of the House of Representatives of the Philippines
Members of the House of Representatives of the Philippines from Ilocos Sur
Nationalist People's Coalition politicians
Independent politicians
Liberal Party (Philippines) politicians
Lakas–CMD (1991) politicians
Laban ng Demokratikong Pilipino politicians
Kilusang Bagong Lipunan politicians
21st-century Filipino politicians
20th-century Filipino politicians